George Keith may refer to:

 George Keith (missionary) (1638/39–1719), Scottish Quaker missionary
 George Keith (footballer) (born 1944), Scottish-born former footballer who represented Australia
 George Mouat Keith (1764–1832), Royal Navy officer
 George Noel Keith (1921–1943), pilot during World War II 
 George Skene Keith (1752–1823), Scottish minister and writer
 George Skene Keith (physician) (1819–1910), Scottish physician, photographer and author
 George Keith, 5th Earl Marischal (died 1623), Scottish nobleman
 George Keith, 10th Earl Marischal (1692–1778), Scottish and Prussian army officer and diplomat
 George L. Keith (1924–2012), Canadian politician in the Legislative Assembly of New Brunswick